National Route 332 is a national highway of Japan connecting Naha Airport and central Naha, Okinawa in Japan, with a total length of 3.1 km (1.93 mi).

References

National highways in Japan
Roads in Okinawa Prefecture